The Saint-Michel Cup (in French: Coupe du Saint-Michel) is an annual Senegalese basketball cup competition. Jeanne d'Arc holds the record for most won titles with 13.

Finals

References{{ 

Basketball competitions in Senegal

Basketball cup competitions in Africa